KTBH-FM (102.7 FM) – branded 102.7 The Beach – is a Hot AC/Oldies formatted broadcast radio station licensed to Kurtistown, Hawaii, serving the island of Hawaii. KTBH-FM is owned and operated by Resonate Hawaii, LLC, a division of Australia-based Resonate Broadcasting.

Previous Logo

External links
102.7 The Beach Online

Radio stations established in 2008
TBH-FM
Hot adult contemporary radio stations in the United States
Resonate Broadcasting
2008 establishments in Hawaii